Bedok North Bus Depot is an SBS Transit East District bus depot located in Bedok, Singapore. 

Bedok North Bus Depot started operations in 1982 after the completion of the stretch of road within Bedok North Industrial Park. It replaces the former Changi Bus Depot and Somapah Bus Park which were close to the residential areas and were subject to noise-related complaints.

Since 11 December 2011, Service 48 terminates at Bedok North Depot with boarding and alighting done outside at the pair of bus stops. Previously, it terminated  at Upper East Coast Bus Terminal.

Service 18 also terminates here since 27 November 2022. Previously, it terminated at Bedok Bus Interchange.

References

External links
 Interchanges and Terminals (SBS Transit)

Bus garages
Bus stations in Singapore
1982 establishments in Singapore